Joseph Gabriel Goddard (4 February 1933 – 22 February 2019) was a Trinidadian sprinter. He competed in the men's 100 metres at the 1956 Summer Olympics.

References

External links
 

1933 births
2019 deaths
Athletes (track and field) at the 1956 Summer Olympics
Trinidad and Tobago male sprinters
Olympic athletes of Trinidad and Tobago
Athletes (track and field) at the 1958 British Empire and Commonwealth Games
Commonwealth Games competitors for Trinidad and Tobago